Shelley Joyce Correll is an American sociologist. She is the Michelle Mercer and Bruce Golden Family Professor of Women’s Leadership
Director at Stanford University.

Early life and education
Correll was born and raised in Houston, Texas, to a police officer father and stay-at-home mother, neither of whom went to college. Growing up, her family was big fans of the Houston Astros and she saw games played in the Astrodome. Upon earning her Bachelor of Arts degree from Texas A&M University, Correll became a high school chemistry teacher while also interning at Dow Chemical Company and taking master’s levels classes in sociology at the University of Houston. She noticed that the boys in her chemistry class were undeterred by setbacks while the girls lacked confidence to believe they were good at chemistry in spite of good grades.  Correll was encouraged by one of her professors to apply for a PhD in sociology and received a full scholarship to Stanford University. Her thesis was focused on "the way that stereotypes about fields affect the extent to which men and women come to see themselves as being skilled in that area." While working towards her thesis, she earned funding from Stanford's Institute for Research on Women and Gender to study why women and men end up in sex-segregated fields or specialties.

Career
Upon graduating with her PhD from Stanford, Correll was extended a faculty position at the institution's sociology program. Upon accepting the position, she co-led a gender-equity directive called CU-ADVANCE, with funding from the National Science Foundation. The aim of the initiative was to recruit more women for engineering and science faculty positions. One of the results of this directive found that women were underrepresented at Cornell's sciences, engineering, social science, behavioral science, and math programs and felt less satisfied in their positions.

As co-director of the Advancing Cornell's Commitment to Excellence and Leadership, Correll also began developing the Motherhood penalty theory, which argued that women with children were considered less competent and dedicated than their childless or male coworkers. Working alongside graduate student Stephen Benard, they authored Getting a Job: Is There a Motherhood Penalty? and Cognitive Bias and the Motherhood Penalty. They surveyed paid undergraduate student-volunteers to evaluate fake resumes and determine which person would be the best to head a new marketing department. All students were given equally qualified, same-gender profiles with different parental status. The conclusion of the survey determined that participants viewed mothers as significantly less competent and committed than women without children. As a result of her research, Corell was the recipient of a 2008 Alice H. Cook and Constance E. Cook Award and 2009 Rosabeth Moss Kanter Award for Excellence in Work Family Research.

Correll was promoted to Full professor of Sociology in 2012 and later named the inaugural Director of the Clayman Institute for Gender Research, a center aimed at promoting women’s leadership in business, government and education. In this role, Correll authored a new method for reducing gender biases and inequalities within the workforce which focuses on re-education. She led a research team over three years using this method of re-education with several technology companies, resulting in positive outcomes. When speaking of her method, Correll said it focused on "educating managers and workers about bias, diagnosing where gender bias could enter their company’s hiring, promotion or other evaluation practices and working with the company’s leaders to develop tools that help measurably reduce bias and inequality." In recognition of her efforts, Correll received the 2017 Feminist Mentor Award by Sociologists for Women in Society.

Correll stepped down as director of the Clayman Institute for Gender Research after nine years and was replaced by Adrian Daub. She was introduced to Michelle Mercer during her tenure as director and was specifically appointed the Michelle Mercer and Bruce Golden Family Professor of Women’s Leadership Director in 2019 as a "tribute of her important work."

References

External links
 

Living people
Texas A&M University alumni
Stanford University alumni
Stanford University faculty
American sociologists
American women sociologists
Academics from Houston
Year of birth missing (living people)
21st-century American women